The 43rd People's Choice Awards, honoring the best in popular culture for 2016, were held on January 18, 2017, at the Microsoft Theater in Los Angeles, California, and were broadcast live on CBS. The ceremony was hosted by Joel McHale.

On November 15, 2016, the nominees were announced. The movie Captain America: Civil War received the most nominations of the year with seven. The TV series Grey’s Anatomy and actor Kevin Hart each received five nominations and singer, Britney Spears and Zootopia received four nominations. The biggest winner of the evening was Spears, who won a total of four awards, and Ellen DeGeneres, who won three and became the most awarded person in the show's history.

Performers
 Fifth Harmony – "Work from Home"
 Blake Shelton – "Every Time I Hear That Song"

Nominees
The full list of nominees was announced on November 15, 2016.

Movies

Television

Music

Digital

References

January 2017 events in the United States
People's Choice Awards
2017 awards in the United States
2017 in American television
2017 in Los Angeles